Idrottsföreningen Saab was a Swedish sports club from Linköping, Östergötland County founded in 1941 by people working at Saab and most known for its association football and handball teams. They took part in the 1973 Allsvenskan. In 1981, IF Saab merged with BK Derby to form Linköpings FF.

Beside football, the club also had active sections for the sports badminton, bandy, table tennis, bowling, boxing, archery, bicycle racing, athletics, gymnastics, handball, company sports, skiing, orienteering, tennis and varpa.

References

Defunct football clubs in Sweden
1941 establishments in Sweden
Sport in Linköping
Association football clubs established in 1941
Bandy clubs established in 1941
Handball clubs established in 1941